Leigh is a townland in the civil parish of Twomileborris, County Tipperary.

At the time of the 1911 census, there were 17 households in the townland.

References

Townlands of County Tipperary